Darius Jamar Thompson (born May 4, 1995) is an American basketball player for Baskonia of the Spanish Liga ACB and the EuroLeague. In 2019, he won the DBL Most Valuable Player award.

Professional career

ZZ Leiden
In August 2018, Thompson signed a one-year contract with ZZ Leiden of the Dutch Basketball League (DBL) and FIBA Europe Cup. On October 27, 2018, Thompson scored 32 points in a 73–78 win over Den Helder Suns. On November 7, Thompson led Leiden to a win over Sakarya BB in the FIBA Europe Cup by scoring 36 points. On March 31, Thompson won the NBB Cup with Leiden, after scoring 25 points in the final. On April 24, 2019, Thompson won the DBL Most Valuable Player award.

Brindisi
On July 23, 2019, Thompson signed a one-year contract with an option for a second season with Happy Casa Brindisi of the Italian Lega Basket Serie A (LBA) and Basketball Champions League (BCL).

Lokomotiv Kuban
On July 1, 2021, Thompson left Brindisi after two years and signed in the VTB United League for the Russian team Lokomotiv Kuban. He left the team after the 2022 Russian invasion of Ukraine.

Baskonia
On August 12, 2022, he has signed with Baskonia of the Spanish Liga ACB and the EuroLeague.

Honors
ZZ Leiden
NBB Cup: 2018–19
DBL Most Valuable Player: 2018–19
All-DBL Team: 2018–19
DBL scoring leader: 2018–19
DBL Statistical Player of the Year: 2018–19

References

External links
Virginia Cavaliers bio
Tennessee Volunteers bio

1995 births
Living people
American expatriate basketball people in Italy
American expatriate basketball people in the Netherlands
American men's basketball players
Basketball players from Tennessee
B.S. Leiden players
Dutch Basketball League players
Lega Basket Serie A players
New Basket Brindisi players
People from Murfreesboro, Tennessee
PBC Lokomotiv-Kuban players
Shooting guards
Tennessee Volunteers basketball players
Virginia Cavaliers men's basketball players
Western Kentucky Hilltoppers basketball players
ZZ Leiden players